Mihara Yasuhiro (born June, 1972) is a Japanese fashion designer who founded his own fashion brand.

Biography 
Yasuhiro was born in June 1972 in Nagasaki, Japan.

Yasuhiro launched his first brand, archi doom in 1996. Later on he introduced a label called SOSU MIHARA YASUHIRO.

His own collection of shoes labelled "PUMA by MIHARA YASUHIRO" debuted in 2000 in Japan. Yasuhiro spent two years working on Puma sneaker shoes, releasing his adapted versions in 2000.

References

Living people
Japanese fashion designers
Tama Art University alumni
1972 births